Audenshaw is a market town in Tameside, Greater Manchester, England,  east of Manchester. Historically part of Lancashire, in 2011 it had a population of 11,419.

The name derives from Aldwin, a Saxon personal name, and the Old English suffix shagh meaning "Woodland". Nico Ditch, an early-medieval linear earthwork possibly built as a defensive barrier against Vikings, runs through the area. Medieval Audenshaw was a division of the township of Ashton in the county of Lancashire. Audenshaw expanded as a centre for textile manufacture during the Industrial Revolution and the Victorian era with inhabitants employed in hat-making, cotton-spinning, calico-printing, and silk-weaving. In 1974, Audenshaw Urban District became part of the Metropolitan Borough of Tameside.

History

The name Audenshaw is a corruption of its earlier name Aldwinshagh which derives from Aldwin, a Saxon personal name, combined with the Old English suffix shagh meaning "Woodland".

Nico Ditch, a medieval linear earthwork, runs through the area. Stretching  from Ashton Moss in the east to just east of Stretford in the west, the origin of the ditch is unclear. According to legend, it was completed in a single night by the inhabitants of Manchester, as a protection against Viking invaders in 869–870, and that it was the site of a bloody battle between Saxons and Danes and that Gorton and Reddish got their name from the battle, "Gore Town" and "Red-Ditch". Despite the legend, the U-shape of the ditch – as opposed to the usual V-shape of military earthworks – and the absence of an associated bank indicates that Nico Ditch was probably a boundary marker. Although it is thought to be earlier, the earliest documented reference to Nico Ditch is in a charter detailing the granting of land in Audenshaw to the monks of the Kersal Cell. In the document, dating from 1190 to 1212, the ditch is referred to as "Mykelldiche", and a magnum fossatum, Latin for "large ditch".

In 1877, part of the original village of Audenshaw was demolished to make way for the three Audenshaw Reservoirs. Also destroyed to allow the construction of the reservoirs was a section of Nico Ditch.

Governance

During the Early Middle Ages Audenshaw is supposed to have been a
thanage held by Saxons, but following the Norman conquest of England fell within the historic county boundaries of Lancashire, and noted as a division of Ashton, an ancient township and parish within the hundred of Salford. The division of Audenshaw spanned the village of Audenshaw, and the outlying settlements of Danehead, Hooleyhill, Littlemoss, North-street, Walkmill, Waterhouses and Woodhouses. This arrangement persisted until the creation of Audenshaw's first local authority, a local board of health in 1870. Audenshaw Local Board of Health was a regulatory body responsible for standards of hygiene and sanitation in the locality. Under the Local Government Act 1894, the area of the local board became the Audenshaw Urban District, a local government district in the Ashton-under-Lyne Poor Law Union and administrative county of Lancashire. Under the Local Government Act 1972, the Audenshaw Urban District was abolished, and Audenshaw has, since 1 April 1974, formed an unparished area of the Metropolitan Borough of Tameside, within the Metropolitan county of Greater Manchester.

Audenshaw is represented in Parliament by the Denton and Reddish constituency. Since its creation in 1983, the constituency has been held by the Labour Party, 
Guide Bridge is an area of Audenshaw.

The Member of Parliament for the Denton and Reddish constituency since 2005 has been Andrew Gwynne MP, representing the Labour Party. His majority in the 2005 general election was 13,498 over the Conservative candidate Julie Searle.

Audenshaw is an electoral ward of Tameside, England.

The ward is represented by three councillors: Oliver Ryan (Lab), Maria Bailey (Lab), and Teresa Smith (Lab)

 indicates seat up for re-election.

Demography

According to the Office for National Statistics, at the time of the United Kingdom Census 2001, Audenshaw had a population of 12,790. Of those over 16 years old, 28.4% were single (never married), 43.3% married, and 8.8% divorced. Audenshaw's 5,260 households included 29.0% one-person, 38.5% married couples living together, 8.8% were co-habiting couples, and 11.4% single parents with their children. Of those aged 16–74, 33.4% had no academic qualifications, similar to the Tameside average (35.2%), but above that of England (28.9%).

In 1951 the breakdown of social class in Audenshaw was recorded as 22.7% middle class and 19.3% working class. By 1971, this had changed to 23.4 middle class and 17.2% working class. The rest of the population was made up of clerical workers and skilled manual workers.

At the 2001 UK census, 80.28% of Audenshaw's residents reported themselves as being Christian, 1.1% Muslim, 0.6% Hindu, 0.3% Buddhist, and 0.1% Sikh. The census recorded 11.0% as having no religion, 0.2% had an alternative religion and 6.7% did not state their religion.

Population change

Notable people
Matthew Hughes (born 1950): politician, born in Audenshaw; Was the distinguished Principal of John Septamus Roe in Perth who grew the school from a small school in Mirrabooka to the largest private school in the state of WA. Matthew went on to become the first Labor party Member of the Legislative Assembly for the electorate of Kalamunda.
 Lonelady: 21st-century singer and guitarist, real name Julie Campbell, comes from Audenshaw
Ellis Plummer (born 1994): Manchester City footballer; born in Audenshaw
Brooke Vincent (born 1992): actress, Sophie Webster in Coronation Street; born in Audenshaw
 Mick Hucknall (born 1960): singer, went to school at Audenshaw School
 Austin Hopkinson (born 1879–1962) Audenshaw MDC Councillor, MP, Founder of Audenshaw engineering firm, Pikrose, benefactor, donated his home Ryecroft Hall to the people of Audenshaw.

Transport
Audenshaw was once served by a mainline railway station. The station closed in 1950. The town is now served by a tram stop on the East Manchester line of the Manchester Metrolink, providing services westbound to Eccles and MediaCityUK and eastbound to Ashton-under-Lyne.

The bus 220 runs between Manchester city centre and Stalybridge, via Openshaw, Audenshaw and Dukinfield. The bus 221 runs between Dukinfield and Manchester city centre, via Audenshaw and Openshaw. The bus 345 runs between Ashton-under-Lyne and Denton, via Dukinfield and Audenshaw. The bus 347 runs between Ashton-under-Lyne and Haughton Green, via Guide Bridge, Audenshaw and Denton.

Economy

Prior to the Industrial Revolution, the main occupation in Audenshaw was that of farming. The earliest recorded agriculture in the Tameside area was in Audenshaw in the period 1190–1212. As was the case in neighbouring Denton, in the 19th century most of Audenshaw's residents were occupied in the hatting industry, the manufacture of cotton and silk, and calico printing.

According to the 2001 UK census, the industry of employment Audenshaw's residents aged 16–74 was 20.3% manufacturing, 18.7% retail and wholesale, 10.1% property and business services, 9.0% health and social work, 8.2% construction, 6.8% transport and communications, 6.3% education, 6.2% public administration, 5.2% finance, 3.8% hotels and restaurants, 0.9% energy and water supply, 0.4% agriculture, 0.1% mining, and 4.0% other. Compared with national figures, the town had a relatively high percentage of residents working in manufacturing (14.8% in England).

The census recorded the economic activity of residents aged 16–74, 2.2% students were with jobs, 3.0% students without jobs, 4.7% looking after home or family, 6.5% permanently sick or disabled, and 2.7% economically inactive for other reasons.

Landmarks

There are nine Grade II listed buildings in Audenshaw*. These include two lodges which were originally a single barn, a trough and pillar, and St Stephen's Church. The church was constructed in 1846, at a cost of £2,900 (equivalent to £ in ) and provided space for a congregation of 750.

Ryecroft Hall, a Grade II listed building, was donated to the people of Audenshaw by the local Member of Parliament, Austin Hopkinson, in 1921.

The war memorial at the entrance to Audenshaw Cemetery is also a Grade II listed building and commemorates the 140 men from Audenshaw who lost their lives in World War I. Standing , it features a bronze statue of a soldier standing on top of a square column; the sculptor was Percy George Bentham. There are slabs of black granite on the fours sides of the column with the names of the deceased. Unveiled in 1920 before a 10,000 strong crowd, it cost £1,300 (£ in ).

Education

There are two nursery schools, five primary schools, and one secondary school in Audenshaw. Opened in 1932 as Audenshaw Grammar School for Boys, Audenshaw School is now the only secondary school in the town. In 2008, the school was the most successful in the borough in terms of proportion of pupils attaining five or more A*–C grades at General Certificate of Secondary Education (GCSE) including maths and English (64% in Audenshaw School compared with the average of 41.8% for Tameside and 47.6% for England) and most points per pupil at A-level. It is a specialist technology college. Until 1964, secondary education was also provided by Poplar Street Primary School which was built in 1914, although its primary school still exists.

Sport
The Audenshaw Greyhound Racing and Sports Ground existed from the turn of the 20th century, initially as an athletic and coursing ground and then as a trotting track, speedway dirt track and greyhound racing track until 1934. This is not to be confused with the Athletics stadium that existed on the south side of the Manchester Road. Audenshaw is also home to the historic rugby club Aldwinians RUFC, once captain by England's rugby union captain from 1956 to 1958, Eric Evans MBE.

See also

Listed buildings in Audenshaw
List of mills in Tameside
List of people from Tameside
Audenshaw Junction rail accident

References

Notes

Bibliography

External links

e-tameside.co.uk – Guide to Tameside online
The Government Site
Audenshaw Local History
Audenshaw Libraries, a history
St Hilda's Church, Audenshaw
Audenshaw Booklets

 
Towns in Greater Manchester
Unparished areas in Greater Manchester
Geography of Tameside